Henry Bindley Sidwell (1857 – 31 August 1936) was the first Bishop of George, the first South African-born bishop to head a diocese.

He was born in Grahamstown and educated at the University of the Cape of Good Hope. Ordained in  1889 he began his career with a curacy in Johannesburg after which he was rector of Middleburg and then Archdeacon of Pretoria before his appointment to the episcopate. He died in post on 31 August 1936.

Publications

References

External links 
 Wits historical papers
 

1857 births
People from Makhanda, Eastern Cape
University of South Africa alumni
Archdeacons of Pretoria
20th-century Anglican Church of Southern Africa bishops
Anglican bishops of George
1936 deaths